John of Rheinfelden, also Johannes Teuto and John of Basle (born c. 1340), was a Dominican friar and writer who published the oldest known description in Europe of playing cards.

Life and works 
Brother John was born around 1340 in Freiburg im Breisgau. Little is known of his life, it is only substantiated by his treatise (Traktat), published in Basle 1377, and the personal information it contains. He was probably a member of Basle's Dominican monastery, but lived in Freiburg im Breisgau. He is usually known as John of Rheinfelden, although Dummett says this is "probably wrong."

He wrote the treatise De moribus et disciplina humanae conversationis id est ludus cartularum (also referred to as Ludus cartularum moralisatus), the oldest surviving detailed description of playing cards in Europe from the Middle Ages, which he wrote in 1377 as bans on playing cards began to proliferate. The tract is modelled on the "Chess Allegory" (Schachallegorie) of fellow friar James of Cessoles. Card games   are attested for the first time in Europe by the Signoria of Florence on 23 March 1377. It is likely that they originally came from China and probably only reached Europe via India and Egypt a decade earlier. So Rheinfelden's treatise was very topical. Strasbourg, about 50 kilometres from Freiburg, became a centre of playing card production in the 15th century. In addition to other versions, the author mentions the still common 4x13 sheet as the basic template, whereby the King, Ober and Unter ("marshals") are mentioned as court cards, but Maids and Queens are also known.

In the foreword, the author explains the purpose of his treatise: firstly to explain the pack of cards, its components and the rules of the game, secondly to derive moral instructions for nobles from the card game with reference to the different "courts" (suits) of the pack, thirdly similar instructions for the derive simple people by assigning professions to numerical cards.

Johannes writes that the newly introduced cards seemed like a revelation to him and the knowledge that they could be used as a means of understanding and explaining the world had moved him. He uses his description of the card figures as the starting point for a broad presentation and interpretation of the corresponding functions at court. Thus, the tract also gives a general insight into the medieval way of thinking, how the social order is structured. He presents his enormous wealth of knowledge, for example by referring to the Bible, the Latin classics, Boëthius, church father Isidor and Doctor of the Church, Thomas Aquinas. Some of Rheinfelden's views seem natural to us and he is not afraid of more controversial topics.

The original treatise, which was probably illustrated, has not survived (it may have been destroyed in the Franco-Prussian War) but has been handed down in four expanded manuscripts:
 Hs. F IV.43 (University Library of Basel), 1429
 Hs. 4143 (Austrian National Library Vienna), 1472 (Digitalisat online, Johannes' Treatise begins at fol. 88r, d. i. p. 181 of the digitalised copy)
 Hs. 225 (library of the University of Utrecht), 1472
 Hs. Egerton 2419 (British Library, London), 1472

So far there is no complete printed edition, a text-critical edition by Arne Jönsson, professor at the University of Lund, is in preparation.

References

Literature 
 
 Geisberg, Max (1910). Das Kartenspiel der Königlichen Staats- u. Altertümer-Sammlung in Stuttgart, Strasbourg, pp. 14 f. (Reprint: Alte Spielkarten) (= Studien zur deutschen Kunstgeschichte, Vol. 66, 132, 205), pp. 116f. Baden-Baden 1973. With an extract of the first chapter of the treatise.
 Jönsson, Arne (2005). Card-playing as a Mirror of Society - On Johannes of Rheinfelden's Ludus cartularum moralisatus. In: Ferm, Olle och Volker Honemann (eds.), Chess and Allegory in the Middle Ages (Sällskapet Runica et Mediævalia, Münster, Stockholm and Uppsala Universities), Stockholm 2005, pp. 359–372.
 Jönsson, Arne (1998). Der Ludus cartularum moralisatus des Johannes von Rheinfelden. In: Schweizer Spielkarten, Vol. 1: Die Anfänge im 15. und 16. Jahrhundert, pp. 135–147. Schaffhausen
 
 
 
 
 
 Lexikon für Theologie und Kirche, Vol. V, p. 1075

External links 
 Johannes of Rheinfelden, 1377, by Lothar Teikemeier (English)
 Johannes Teutonicus: De moribus et disciplina humanae conversationis, Handschrift Egerton 2419, British Library (with image of the front page)

Members of the Dominican Order
German male writers
Card game book writers
Medieval Latin literature
14th-century writers
1340 births
14th-century deaths
Year of birth uncertain